U-53 may refer to one of the following German submarines:

 , a Type U 51 submarine launched in 1916 and that served in the First World War until surrendered 1 December 1918; broken up at Swansea in 1922
 During the First World War, Germany also had these submarines with similar names:
 , a Type UB III submarine launched in 1917 and sunk on 3 August 1918
 , a Type UC II submarine launched in 1916 and scuttled on 28 October 1918
 , a Type VIIB submarine that served in the Second World War until sunk on 23 February 1940

Submarines of Germany